Bouma Ekghor is a 2022 Bengali comedy drama television series that premiered on 2 May 2022 on Bengali General Entertainment Channel Star Jalsha. The show has been produced by Susanta Das under the banner of Tent Cinema. The show stars Susmita Dey, Debojyoti Roy Chowdhury, Chaiti Ghosal, Nibedita Mukherjee, Aakash Ghosh in  the lead roles.

Due to less TRPs, not being too popular and as audiences didn't like the show so much, the serial went off-air on 5 August with 86 episodes.

Plot 
The story is about two brothers and their families. One of them enjoys a luxurious lifestyle and is modern, while the other has some financial issues. The wives of the families compete with each other to prove whose daughter-in-law is better. Raju, who dreams of being an automobile engineer, works in a garage due to circumstances. Tia, a girl who daydreams, and has no wish to get a job, gets married to Raju, a son of the Ghosh family. Raju's mother finally finds a way to beat her sister-in-law in the competition, and she presents Tia as a working woman. She tells the family that her new daughter-in-law is a careerist and works in a well known company. But the problem turns up when the family suspects the fact. Raju's mother continuously pursues Tia to look for a job to save her reputation, but Tia is reluctant in her words. This process of finding a job in an 'unwanted' manner leads to a funny series of events.

Cast

Main 
 Susmita Dey as Tiya Ghosh (née Mondal) – A carefree girl who has no wish to work and to go Dubai after marriage; Raju's wife. 
 Debojyoti Roy Chowdhury as Raju Ghosh – A garage mechanic, who dreamt of becoming an automobile engineer; Tiya's husband.

Recurring 
 Nibedita Mukherjee as  Bishnupriya Ghosh – Raju's mother, Tiya's mother in law.
 Subrata Guha Roy as Notu Ghosh- Raju's father, Tiya's father in law
 Chaiti Ghoshal as Snigdha Ghosh – Raju's aunt,
Arindam Ganguly as Botu Ghosh- Snigdha's husband, Raju's uncle
 Rajiv Bose as Aalok Ghosh –Notu and Priya's son, Raju and Pulok's brother, Champa's husband
 Laboni Bhattacharya as Champa Ghosh - Aalok's wife
 Sudip Sarkar as Pulak Ghosh-  notu and Priya's son, Raju and Aalok's brother, Bulbuli's husband
 Somashree Naskar as Bulbuli Ghosh- Pulak's wife
 Indrajit Majumder as Ayan Ghosh- Botu and Snigdha's son, Rishita's husband , oldest son of Ghosh family.
 Arnab Biswas as Dev ghosh- Botu and Snigdha's son, Riya's husband
Aritra Dutta as Ani Ghosh- Botu and snigdha's son, Titas's husband
Jina Tarafder as Titas Ghosh-Ani's wife
Aditi Ghosh as Riya Ghosh - Tiya's cousin sister who doesn't like Tiya at all, Dev's wife
Riya dutta as Rishita Ghosh- Ayan's wife

References

External links 
 Bouma Ekghor on Disney+ Hotstar

Bengali-language television programming in India
2022 Indian television series debuts
Indian drama television series
Star Jalsha original programming
Indian comedy television series
2022 Indian television series endings